Tetrataenite is a native metal alloy composed of chemically-ordered L10-type FeNi, recognized as a mineral in 1980. The mineral is named after its tetragonal crystal structure and its relation to the iron-nickel alloy, taenite. It is one of the mineral phases found in meteoric iron.

Formation 
Tetrataenite forms naturally in iron meteorites that contain taenite that are slow-cooled at a rate of a few degrees per million years, which allows for ordering of the Fe and Ni atoms. It is found most abundantly in slow-cooled chondrite meteorites, as well as in mesosiderites. At high (as much as 52%) Ni content and temperatures below 320 °C (the order-disorder transition temperature), tetrataenite is broken down from taenite and distorts its face centered cubic crystal structure to form the tetragonal L10 structure.

The L10 phase can be synthetically produced by neutron- or electron-irradiation of FeNi below 593 K, by hydrogen-reduction of nanometric NiFe2O4, or by crystallization of Fe-Ni alloys in the presence of traces of phosphorus.

In 2015, it was reported that tetrataenite was found in a terrestrial rock – a magnetite body from the Indo-Myanmar ranges of northeast India.

A laboratory protocol for bulk synthesis, announced in 2022

Mixing iron, nickel and phosphorus together in specific quantities and smelting the mixture forms tetrataenite in bulk quantities, in seconds. This discovery, announced in 2022, raises hopes that some of the technologies which currently require the use of magnetic alloys containing rare earths metals may be achievable using magnets made of tetrataenite as an alternative, which would reduce dependence on toxic, environmentally harmful rare earth mines controlled largely by the Chinese government.

Crystal structure 
Tetrataenite has a highly ordered crystal structure, appearing creamy in color and displaying optical anisotropy. Its appearance is distinguishable from taenite, which is dark gray with low reflectivity. FeNi easily forms into a cubic crystal structure, but does not have magnetic anisotropy in this form. Three variants of the L10 tetragonal crystal structure have been found, as chemical ordering can occur along any of the three axes.

Magnetic properties 
Tetrataenite displays permanent magnetization, in particular, high coercivity. It has a theoretical magnetic energy product, the maximum amount of magnetic energy stored, over 335 kJ m−3.

Applications 
Tetrataenite is a candidate for replacing rare-earth permanent magnets such as samarium and neodymium since both iron and nickel are earth-abundant and inexpensive.

See also
 Glossary of meteoritics
 Superlattice

References

Meteorite minerals
Monoclinic minerals
Minerals in space group 6